Paul Appleby (born 22 July 1987) is a Scottish former professional boxer who competed from 2006 to 2014. He held the British featherweight title from 2008 to 2009 and once challenged for the Commonwealth super featherweight title in 2011. He is the youngest ever British featherweight champion.

Professional career
Appleby turned professional in January 2006 at the St. Andrew's Sporting Club, Glasgow, Scotland. In his debut Appleby defeated Blackburn's Graeme Higginson with a third round stoppage.

Appleby defeated John Simpson on 6 June 2008 at the Kelvin Hall in Glasgow to claim the British featherweight title. He successfully defended the title against Esham Pickering on 28 November 2008, winning by unanimous decision.

On 25 April 2009 Appleby lost his British title against Martin Lindsay at the Ulster Hall, Belfast. The fight was stopped in round 6 after some heavy blows from Lindsay, although Appleby did not suffer a knockdown in the fight.

On 30 September 2008, Appleby was chosen as Britain's Best Young Boxer of the Year by the Boxing Writers Club.

Appleby went on to win the Celtic Super-feather weight title in March 2012 and in November 2012 won the BBofBC 'Contest of the year' with his fight with Liam Walsh, which was classed as a small hall classic on the first night of BoxNation's schedule on 30 September 2011.

Appleby fought Stephen Ormond on 10 March 2012 at the Braehead Arena in Glasgow and won by a unanimous decision.

References

External links
 

Scottish male boxers
1987 births
Living people
Featherweight boxers
People educated at Queensferry High School
People from South Queensferry
Boxers from Edinburgh